Acanthomyrmex crassispinus is a species of ant that belongs to the genus Acanthomyrmex. It was described by Wheeler in 1930, and is found in Taiwan.

References

crassispinus
Insects described in 1930
Insects of Taiwan